The Bornean whistler (Pachycephala hypoxantha) or Bornean mountain whistler, is a species of bird in the family Pachycephalidae. It is endemic to the island of Borneo.

Subspecies
Two subspecies are recognized:
 P. h. hypoxantha – (Sharpe, 1887): found on northern Borneo (Malaysia)
 P. h. sarawacensis – Chasen, 1935: found in western Sarawak (Malaysia)

References

Pachycephala
Endemic birds of Borneo
Birds described in 1887
Taxonomy articles created by Polbot
Fauna of the Borneo montane rain forests